Gabriel de Foigny (ca. 1630-1692) is the author of an important utopia, La Terre Australe connue, 1676.

Life
All we know about Foigny, including his identity (the book was printed without his name), is based exclusively on the second edition of Pierre Bayle's Dictionnaire historique et critique (1701, under "Sadeur"). He was born in Lorraine and became a Franciscan, but left the order. He moved near Geneva, now as a Protestant, and made a living as a tutor. The Terre australe connue was printed at Geneva, as if from Vannes.

In English
Gabriel de Foigny. The Southern Land, Known (La Terre Australe connue, 1676). Trans. and ed. David Fausett. Syracuse UP, 1993

References
Everett F. Bleiler. French Voyages into Imaginary Lands, in: Science Fiction Studies # 63 = Volume 21, Part 2 = July 1994
Geoffroy Atkinson, The Extraordinary Voyage in French Literature Before 1700, 1920 (reissue 1966, AMS Press,  Columbia University studies in Romance philology and literature; also in Google books)
 Marrone Caterina, Le lingue utopiche Nuovi Equilibri, Viterbo, 2004 [1995], p. 338,

Notes

External links
Sadeur in Dictionnaire historique et critique by Pierre Bayle

1630s births
1692 deaths
17th-century French male writers
17th-century French novelists
Year of birth uncertain
French male novelists
Authors of utopian literature